Filipino orthography specifies the correct use of the writing system of the Filipino language, the national and co-official language of the Philippines.

In 2013, the Komisyon sa Wikang Filipino released the Ortograpiyang Pambansa (“National Orthography”), a new set of guidelines for writing the Filipino language.

Alphabet
The modern Filipino alphabet introduced since 1987 consists of 28 letters.

Notes on Filipino orthography
 C, F, J, Ñ, Q, V, X, and Z are used mostly for loanwords, regional words and proper nouns.
 The vowels are A, E, I, O, and U.
 Usual diacritic marks are acute ( ´ ), grave ( ` ), circumflex ( ˆ ), diaeresis ( ¨ ) which are optional, and only used with the vowels. Grave ( ` ) and circumflex ( ˆ ) may only appear at the end of a word ending in a vowel. Diacritics have no impact on collation or alphabetical order. Possible combinations include: á, à, â, é, è, ê, ë, í, ì, î, ó, ò, ô, ú, ù, û. Historically, the tilde was used with <g> (g̃) in many Philippine languages. It was notably used to shorten the words nang (ergative case marker) and man͠gá (pluralization particle) into ng̃ and mg̃á respectively. Today, these two words are usually just simply written as ng and mga.
 Ñ is considered as a separate letter, instead of a letter-diacritical mark combination.
 The alphabet also uses the Ng digraph, even originally with a large tilde that spanned both n and g (as in n͠g) when a vowel follows the digraph. This tilde indicates that the "n͠g" and the vowel should be pronounced as one syllable, such as "n͠ga" in the three-syllable word "pan͠galan" ("name") – syllabicated as [pa-n͠ga-lan], not [pan-ga-lan]. The use of the tilde over the two letters is now rare. Due to technical constraints, machine-printed variants of "n͠ga" emerged, which included "ñga", "ng̃a", and even "gña" (as in the case of Sagñay, Camarines Sur).
 The Ng digraph letter is similar to, but not the same as, the prepositional word ng ("of"/"of the"), originally spelled ng̃ (with a tilde over the g only). The words ng and ng̃ are shortened forms of the word nang.
 Ë is a new variant of e introduced in 2013 to represent /ə/ in Austronesian words of non-Tagalog origin.
 D and R are commonly interchangeable depending on the letter's location: "D" becomes "R" if there is a preceding vowel, e.g. dagat ("sea") to mandaragat ("seafarer"), dunong  ("intelligence") to marunong ("knowledgeable"). This does not, however, apply to some words such as dumadagundong ("booming") as well as loanwords and proper nouns.

History

Pre-Hispanic scripts

During the Pre-Hispanic Era, most of the languages of the Philippines were written in abugida, an ancient segmental writing system. Examples of this ancient Philippine writing system which descended from the  Brāhmī script are the Kawi, Baybayin, Buhid, Hanunó'o, Tagbanwa, Butuan, Kulitan and other Brahmic family of scripts known to antiquity. A controversial and debatable script of the Philippines is the Eskayan script.

Baybayin script began to decline in the 17th century and became obsolete in the 18th century. The scripts that are still in use today by the indigenous Mangyan groups of the Philippines are the Buhid and the Hanunó'o script.

Adoption of the Latin script

When the Spaniards arrived in 1521 and began to colonize the islands of the Philippines in 1565, they  introduced the Latin script to the Catholicized Filipinos. When most of the Philippine languages were first written in the Latin script, they used the Spanish alphabet. This alphabet was called the Abecedario, the original alphabet of the Catholicized Filipinos, which variously had either 28, 29, 31, or 32 letters. Until the first half of the 20th century, most Philippine languages were widely written in a variety of ways based on Spanish orthography.

The writing system of the Muslim Filipinos in the different independent sultanates of Mindanao during the Spanish colonization shifted from abugida script to Arabic alphabet while the writing system of most of the Catholicized Chinese Filipinos shifted from Written Chinese to Abecedario alphabet.

Virtually unutilized from the Abecedario were the letters K and W, which are both used extensively in most Philippine languages today due to the imposition of the Abakada alphabet. Relics of this Abecedario alphabet can still be seen in the way "Castilianized" indigenous and Chinese-origin surnames are written. Some examples of indigenous Filipino surnames are Macasáquit, Guintô, Bañaga, Guipit, Abucajo, Abueg, Bangachon, Dagohoy, Valarao and Dimaculañgan. Some examples of Chinese-origin surnames are Guanzón, Cojuangco, Siapuatco, Yapchulay, Locsín, Quisumbing, Tuazon and Yuchengco. Many indigenous place names are also written using Spanish orthography, often either coexisting or competing with their indigenized forms if they exist (Bulacán or Bulakán, Caloocan or Kalookan, Taguig or Tagig, etc.). Parañaque would be written in the indigenized system as Paranyake, but the latter spelling is so far unaccepted and not known in use. Marikina on the other hand gained acceptance over the older Mariquina.

Quite notable are proper nouns wherein the letter Y is written before consonants and is pronounced I. Iloilo and Ilocos were spelled archaically as Yloylo or Yloílo and Ylocos. Surnames in the Philippines such as Ybañez, Ysagan, Ybarra, Yldefonso and Ylagan are evidences of the Old Spanish writing system. Ylang Ylang, a native Philippine tree valued for its perfume, is another example. The use of the letter Y at the beginning of words, however, gradually shifted to the letter I reflecting revisions in Spanish orthography.

The representation of certain sounds were largely derived from Spanish orthography but differed in several ways. The letter H was utilized to represent the voiceless glottal fricative (/h/) in the orthographies of most Philippine languages during the Spanish period in contrast to the orthography of Spanish which uses the letter J (the letter H in Spanish is silent). Spanish loanwords like Jesús, Justicia, or Jardín, however, often retained their original spelling in Spanish. Archaic use of the letter X in the Old Spanish writing system that is pronounced in a guttural way (quite similar phonetically to H in English even though the sound is different) is evident in surnames such as Roxas. Another example is México, Pampanga.

To represent /k/, "c" was used before the vowels "a", "o", and "u" (i.e. cayo, cong, culang) and at final positions (pumasoc) while a silent "u" was used between "q" and "e" or "i" (i.e. "aquing", "quilala") reflecting Spanish orthography. This is because should "c" be utilized before either "i" or "e", the sound produced would instead be representing /s/ (like Spanish ciudad). These two combination of letters ("ci" and "ce") were not used in native words and "s" was used in all cases to represent /s/. Likewise, in representing /g/, "g" was used before "a", "o", "u" (i.e. "gamit", "tago", "gutom") and at final positions while a silent "u" was used between "g" and "e" or "i" to (i.e. "guitna") so that "gue" represents /ɡe/ and "gui" represents /ɡi/.

The letter W as used today was absent. Instead, "u" was utilized ("gaua", "aua", "uala") and diphthongs written as "aw" today (araw) was written with "ao" (arao). Words like "huwag" and "kapwa" were written as houag and capoua.

A common practice in the orthography of some of the Philippine languages during the Spanish Colonial Period up to the 1960s was the use of tilde written over g̃, a letter which was notably used to shorten the words nang (ergative case marker) and man͠gá (pluralization particle) into ng̃ and mg̃á respectively. No literature could be found that pertained to the rules that governed the usage of this letter or that explained its disappearance. Today, these two words are usually just simply written as ng and mga.

Originally, there was a large tilde that spanned both n and g (as in n͠g) when a vowel follows the Ng digraph. This tilde indicates that the n͠g and the vowel should be pronounced as one syllable, such as n͠ga in the three-syllable word pan͠galan – syllabicated as [pa-n͠ga-lan], not [pan-ga-lan]. The use of the tilde over the two letters is now virtually non-existent.

Due to technical constraints, machine-printed variants of n͠ga emerged, which included ñga, ng̃a, and even gña as in the case of Sagñay – syllabicated as [sa-ngay]. The Ng digraph letter is similar to, but not the same as, the prepositional word ng, originally spelled ng̃ with a tilde over the g only. The words ñg and ng̃ are shortened forms of the word nang. There are some words  with no tilde written over the ng digraph as in the case of barangay from the Tagalog word balan͠gay since it is syllabicated as [ba-rang-gay]. Ilonggo used to be written as Ylongo or Ilongo without a tilde over the ng since it is syllabicated as [i-long-go]. Another example is Zamboanga syllabicated as [zam-bo-ang-ga]. Words that end in ng digraph such as ang, utang and saguing also didn't have tildes over the n or g or both ng.

Contraction of certain words were indicated by two commas such as iba and at → "iba, t,"; Indicated today by a single quotation mark as in English (i.e. iba't).

Diacritic marks were also utilized. Acute ( ´ ), grave ( ` ) and circumflex ( ˆ ) were required and only used with the vowels. The latter two may only appear at the end of a word ending in a vowel. Diacritics had no impact on the primary alphabetical order. Possible combinations include: á, à, â, é, è, ê, í, ì, î, ó, ò, ô, ú, ù and û.

Punctuation marks were also borrowed from Spanish. Quotation marks like « » instead of the quotation marks (" ") were used. The inverted question mark (¿) and inverted exclamation mark (¡) were also utilized at the beginning of phrases ending with either the regular question mark/exclamation mark. 

The vowels were pronounced in a short vowel length [A (ah), E (eh), I (ih), O (oh), U (uh)] while the consonants were pronounced as B (be), C (se), Ch (che), D (de), F (efe), G (he), H (ache), J (hota), K (ka), L (ele), LL (elye), M (eme), N (ene), NG (nang), Ñ (enye), Ñg or Ng̃ or N͠g or Gñ  (ñga or ng̃a or n͠ga or gña), P (pe), Q (ku), R (ere), RR (er-re), S (ese), T (te), V (ve), W (wa), X (ekis), Y (ya or i griega or ye), Z (zeta). This alphabet gradually fell out of use since 1940 due to the imposition of the Abakada alphabet.

Collation of the Abecedario (32 letters):

Late 19th-century orthographic reforms 
Filipino doctor and student of languages Trinidad Pardo de Tavera in his 1887 essay El Sanscrito en la lengua Tagalog made use of a new Tagalog orthography rather than what had then been in use. In 1889, the new bilingual La España Oriental, of which Isabelo de los Reyes was an editor, newspaper began publishing using the new orthography stating in a footnote that it would "use the orthography recently introduced by ... learned Orientalis". This new orthography, while having its supporters, was also not initially accepted by several writers. Soon after the first issue of La España, Pascual H. Poblete's Revista Católica de Filipina began a series of articles attacking the new orthography and its proponents. A fellow writer, Pablo Tecson was also critical. The attacks included that the letters "k" and "w" were of German origin and foreign in nature, thus those promoting it were deemed "unpatriotic". These two publications would eventually merge as La Lectura Popular in January 1890 and would eventually make use of both spelling systems in its articles.

Pedro Laktaw, a schoolteacher, published the first Spanish-Tagalog dictionary using the new orthography in 1890. In April 1890, Jose Rizal authored an article Sobre la Nueva Ortografia de la Lengua Tagalog in the Madrid-based periodical La Solidaridad. In it, he addressed the logicality, in his opinion, of the new orthography and its criticisms, including those by Pobrete and Tecson. Rizal described the orthography promoted by Tavera as "more perfect" than what he himself had developed. José Rizal had also suggested a reform of the orthography of the Philippine languages by replacing the letters C and Q with K. Rizal got the idea after reading an 1884 essay by Trinidad Pardo de Tavera about the ancient Baybayin script. The new orthography was however not broadly adopted initially and was used inconsistently in the bilingual periodicals of Manila.

The revolutionary society Kataás-taasan, Kagalang-galang Katipunan ng̃ mg̃á Anak ng̃ Bayan or Katipunan made use of the k-orthography and the letter k featured prominently on many of its flags and insignias.

Filipino as the national language, the Abakada, and expanded alphabet (1940–1987)

Article XIII, section 3 of the 1935 Constitution of the Philippines provided for the "...development and adoption of a common national language based on one of the existing native languages". For this purpose, the Institute of National Language (INL) was subsequently set-up. After numerous debates among the different language representatives of the Philippines, the NLI passed a resolution dated November 9, 1937 recommending that Tagalog serve as basis for the national language. President Manuel L. Quezon issued Executive Order 134 in December 1937 officially proclaiming this decision.

In 1940, the Balarílà ng Wikang Pambansâ of grammarian Lope K. Santos introduced the Abakada alphabet. This alphabet consists of 20 letters and became the standard alphabet of the national language. The alphabet was officially adopted by the Institute for the Tagalog-Based National Language to “indigenize" the writing system (The Latin script itself (the alphabet) was introduced by the Catholic missionaries of Spain, leaving nothing really to "indigenize").

The Spanish-based orthographies of other Philippine languages that were still using its old orthography began to be gradually replaced with the propagation of the new K-orthographies as more people became familiar with it. The Spanish-based orthographies were gradually wiped out since 1940, due to the imposition of Abakada. The Abakada orthography gradually influenced the languages of the Philippines.

The Abakada orthography was guided by the Balarilà of Santos. Vowels were pronounced with a short vowel length, while consonants were pronounced by appending short A's at the end. Hence, the  name Abakada, from the first 4 letters of the alphabet.

Collation of the Abakada (20 letters):

The Wikang pambansa (national language) was designated as Pilipino in 1959. In 1971, the alphabet was expanded to 31 letters: a, b, c, ch, d, e, f, g, h, i, j, k, l, ll, m, n, ñ, ng, o, p, q, r, rr, s, t, u, v, w, x, y, z.

Modern Filipino alphabet (1987–present)

In 1987, the official language called Pilipino was renamed to Filipino. Article XIV Section 6 of the 1987 Constitution states that "the National language of the Philippines is Filipino. As it evolves, it shall be further developed and enriched on the basis of existing Philippine and other languages".

The Pilipino alphabet was reduced to 28 letters, with the Spanish Ch, Ll and Rr digraphs being dropped from being considered as distinct letters (The Association of Spanish Language Academies itself abandoned the use of Ch and Ll as separate listings in alphabetical collations in 1994. Since 2010, ch and ll are no longer considered distinct letters. Each digraph is now treated as a sequence of two distinct characters, finding occasional use as conjoined pairs.).

The Modern Filipino alphabet is primarily English alphabet plus the Spanish Ñ and Tagalog Ng digraph; these are alphabetised separately in theory. Today, the Modern Filipino alphabet is used, and may also serve as the alphabet for all autochthonous Philippine languages.

Collation of the Modern Filipino Alphabet (28 letters):

The Orthography of the National Language

In August 2007, the Commission on the Filipino Language made available a draft version of Filipino orthography open for comment. This document is a result of a series of consultations with various teachers, instructors, linguists and others in the field that took place between 2006 and 2007.

The document begins by detailing the letters of the alphabet, their order and their names. One set of names is based on English letter names; the other, similar to the former Abakada. Some exceptional names are those letters which were not part of the Abakada: C, se, Q, kwa and X, eksa.

It goes on to name punctuation marks, and describes the use of the acute, grave and circumflex accents in Filipino. Words that already exist in the language are preferred over a borrowed term, for example, tuntunin vs. rul (derived from English rule). In terms of spelling, issues concerning the use of y-/iy- and w-/uw- are codified according to the number of preceding consonants and the origin of the word if it is borrowed.

Lastly, it provides spelling guidelines for words of foreign origin. It focuses mainly on the two languages that have provided a large number of lexical items to the Filipino language, namely Spanish and English. In short, regarding borrowings from these two languages, Spanish words of common usage are written in a manner consistent with Filipino phonology. These words are already in common usage, thus they will not revert to their Spanish spelling. On the other hand, if the words come from English or another foreign source or if the term is derived from Spanish that does not already have a phonetic spelling, it should be spelled phonetically and the use of the 8 new letters is allowed.

Examples:

Spanish teléfono = telépono NOT *teléfono
English psychology = saykoloji
Spanish psicología or sicología = sikolohíya
Spanish silla = silya
Spanish cuchara = kutsara
Spanish caballo = kabayo

Evolution example 
Below is an example of orthography between the Tagalog (Early Spanish-style system) and Filipino (derived from multiple tribe coalitions.) The text used for comparison is the Filipino version of the Lord's Prayer. The phrase in square brackets is the doxology "for thine is the kingdom, and the power, and the glory forever".

 Early Tagalog System (taken from Doctrina Christiana,)
 Ama namin, nasa Lan͠gitca,
 Ypasamba Mo ang N͠galanmo.
 Mouisaamin ang pagcaharimo.
 Ypasonor mo ang loob mo
 Dito sa lupa para sa Lan͠git.
 Bigya mo cami n͠gaion ng amin cacanin para nang sa arao-arao.
 At patauarin Mo ang amin casalanã,
 Yaiang uinaualan bahala namĩ sa loob
 Ang casalanan nang nagcacasala sa amin.
 Houag Mo caming æwan nang dicami matalo ng tocso,
 Datapouat yadia mo cami sa dilan masama.
 [Sapagcat iyo an caharian at capaniarihan
 At caloualhatian, magpacailan man.]
 Amen Jesús.

 Modern Filipino orthography
 Amá namin, sumasalangit Ka,
 Sambahín ang Ngalan Mo.
 Mapasaamin ang kaharián Mo.
 Sundín ang loób Mo
 Dito sa lupà, para nang sa langit.
 Bigyán Mo kamí ngayón ng aming kakanin sa araw-araw.
 At patawarin Mo kamí sa aming mga salà,
 Para nang pagpápatawad namin
 Sa mga nagkakasalà sa amin.
 At huwág Mo kamíng ipahintulot sa tuksó,
 At iadyâ Mo kamí sa lahát ng masamâ.
 [Sapagkát sa Iyó ang kaharián, at ang kapangyarihan,
 At ang kaluwálhatian, magpakailanmán.]
 Amen Hesús.

See also
Dambana
Filipino alphabet
Filipino language
Komisyon sa Wikang Filipino

References

Notes
Wika.PBWorks.com, Komisyon sa Wikang Filipino, August 1, 2007
The Orthography of the National Language (Final), Republic of the Philippines, Department of Education, No. 104 s.2009.
Proyectos-Saluda, KWF Komisyon sa Wikang Filipino, Proyectos-Saluda.org
Proyectos-Saluda, Part I: Definitions, KWF Komisyon sa Wikang Filipino, Proyectos-Saluda.org
Nang or ng? – The long and the short of it, In Other Words by Paul Morrow, Pilipino Express, Pilipino-Express.com, July 1, 2006.
The evolution and disappearance of the "Ğ" in Philippine orthographies since the 1593 Doctrina Cristiana  by Richard C. Signey, Instituto Cervantes, Manila. Accessed May 25, 2009.

External links
Commission on the Filipino Language website 
Commission on the Filipino Language wiki
Ortograpiyang Pambansa (2013 edition) KWF

Filipino language
Latin-script orthographies